Battle of Dalmatia may apply to the following battles of the Croatian War of Independence:

 Battle of Zadar 
 Battle of Šibenik
 Siege of Dubrovnik
 Battle of the Dalmatian channels